Gnorismoneura prochyta is a moth of the family Tortricidae. It is found in India and Vietnam.

References

Moths described in 1908
Archipini